Fuyan Temple is a Buddhist temple located on Mount Heng, in Nanyue District of Hengyang, Hunan, China. It has been designated as a National Key Buddhist Temple in Han Chinese Area in 1983.

History
The construction of the temple, originally named "Bore Chan Temple" or "Bore Temple", was initiated in 567 by Nanyue Huisi during the Six Dynasties period (222-589). 

During the Zhenguan period (627-649) of Tang dynasty (618-907), Emperor Taizong of Tang gave 50 volumes of Buddhist scriptures to the temple. In 713, in the 2nd year of Xiantian period, Nanyue Huairang came here and served as its abbot.

During the Taiping Xingguo period of Song dynasty (960-1279), Emperor Taizong of Song inscribed and honored the name "Fuyan Temple", and the name has been retained today.

In 1870, in the 9th year of Tongzhi period of Qing dynasty (1644-1911), the local government reconstructed the temple.

In 1983, it has been categorized as a  National Key Buddhist Temple in Han Chinese Area.

Architecture
Fuyan Temple has more than 10 buildings and halls, the well-preserved buildings include the shanmen, the Hall of Holy Emperor of Mount Heng, the Mahavira Hall, the Abbot's Room, the Dharma Hall, the Hall of Guru, the Buddhist Texts Library, the Meditation Hall, and the Huayan Pavilion.

Hall of Holy Emperor of Mount Heng
The Hall of Holy Emperor of Mount Heng is the third hall of the temple for the worship of the Holy Emperor of Mount Heng.

Ginkgo trees
The temple has four old ginkgo trees. One of them is already 1400-years-old.

Mahavira Hall
The Mahavira Hall is the fourth hall in the temple. Statues of Horizontal Three-Life Buddha are enshrined in the hall, namely Sakyamuni (middle), Amitabha (right) and Bhaisajya (left). The statue of Horizontal Three-Life Buddha are enshrined in the center with Eighteen Arhats lining up on both sides.

Gallery

References

Further reading

External links

Buddhist temples in Hunan
Nanyue District